Kluki  (Slovincian: Kláhi, Kláčicä;) is a village in the administrative district of Gmina Smołdzino, within Słupsk County, Pomeranian Voivodeship, in northern Poland.

Kluki was settled by the Slovincians and features an open-air museum, Muzeum Wsi Słowińskiej (Museum of the Slovincian Village), a division of the Muzeum Pomorza Środkowego w Słupsku (Central Pomerania Museum in Słupsk).

The village has a population of 90.

References

Kluki